Choreutis argoxantha is a moth in the family Choreutidae. It was described by Edward Meyrick in 1934. It is found on Java in Indonesia.

References

Choreutis
Moths described in 1934